Samuel B. "Pony" Sager (August 12, 1848 – October 15, 1928) was a Major League Baseball left fielder and shortstop for one month in 1871.  He played for the Rockford Forest Citys of the National Association.

From May 6 to May 30, Sager played in eight games for the club, four in left field and four at shortstop. He was a below-average fielder at both positions, but did show speed and a strong bat. He went 11-for-39 (.282) with five runs batted in, five stolen bases, and nine runs scored.

One of Sager's teammates on the Forest Citys was 19-year-old future Baseball Hall of Famer Cap Anson, his teammate Marshalltown, Iowa whom he convinced the team to sign.

External links
Baseball Reference
Retrosheet

1848 births
1928 deaths
19th-century baseball players
Major League Baseball left fielders
Major League Baseball shortstops
Rockford Forest Citys players
Baseball players from Pennsylvania
Sportspeople from Marshalltown, Iowa